Naturforschende Gesellschaft in Zürich (NGZH; Society of Natural Sciences Zurich) is a Swiss scientific society, founded in 1746  for the purposes of promoting the study of the natural sciences. Prior to that it was known as the Physikalische Gesellschaft, originating in the sixteenth century, when Conrad Gessner and his colleagues first established it in Zürich. As such, it is one of the oldest scientific societies in Switzerland. The society states it mission as "Accessing the 'exact knowledge of nature' through meticulous observations and experiments, and to foster public understanding of the natural sciences, fundamental and applied". To this end it organizes free lectures and excursions and awards an annual prize for high school science projects (NGZH-Jugendpreis). As of 2016, there were 350 members, and the president was Fritz Gassmann. Within the Swiss Academy of Natural Sciences, the NGZH is a member organisation of the Natural Sciences Platform. The society maintains a botanical garden based on Conrad Gessner's original herbarium and library and carries out experiments. It is associated with both the University of Zurich and the Institute of Technology (Eidgenössische Technische Hochschule Zürich)

Publications 

Publications include a quarterly journal, the Vierteljahrsschrift der Naturforschenden Gesellschaft in Zürich (established 1856) which promotes current research in Zurich. Previously it was known as the Verhandlungen (1826–1837) and the Mitteilungen (1847–1856). A more comprehensive annual publication is the Neujahrsblatt der Naturforschenden Gesellschaft in Zürich (established 1799, published on December 31st, and which goes on sale at the Zentralbibliothek (Central Library) on January 2nd. There is also a youth-orientated publication, the Jugend-Neujahrsblatt. In 1965, the Neujahrsblatt was devoted to the life and work of Conrad Gessner, to celebrate the 400th anniversary of his death.

References

Bibliography 

 
 
 
 

Switzerland